Philip Williams (born 3 June 1967) is a Welsh former professional snooker player. He was a professional for most seasons between 1993–94 and 2003–04, but failed to establish himself, his highest ranking position being 104. His best performances both came in 2001, when he reached the last 64 of both the Benson & Hedges Championship and the British Open.

As an amateur, he won the Welsh Championship in 2006. He then reached the quarter-final at the amateur 2006 IBSF World Snooker Championship in Amman, Jordan, where he was eliminated by Kurt Maflin 6–3. In the 2008 IBSF World Snooker Championship he was beaten by Alok Kumar. In the 2009 IBSF World Snooker Championship he was eliminated in the semi-finals by Alfie Burden of England. In 2010 he won the IBSF World Masters Championship in Damascus, Syria, beating Thailand's Chuchart Trairattanapradit 6 – 4.

In 2013 he was a surprise qualifier for the Last 16 of the WPBSA World Seniors Championship – his qualifying tournament wins included defeats of 2 former top 16 players, Gary Wilkinson and Patsy Fagan. He qualified again in 2021, losing to eventual winner David Lilley in the last 16.

References

External links 
Snooker Player Profile for Philip Williams
IBSF profile

Living people
1968 births
Welsh snooker players